Carl Friedrich Georg Heinrici (14 March 1844– 29 September 1915) was a German Protestant theologian best known for his studies involving the relationship of early Christianity with its Greek environment.

Biography 
From 1862 to 1867 he studied theology and philosophy at the universities of Halle-Wittenberg and Berlin. In 1873 he became an associate professor of New Testament exegesis at the University of Marburg, where during the following year, he attained a full professorship. In 1892 he succeeded Theodor Zahn as professor of New Testament exegesis at the University of Leipzig, where in 1911/12 he served as rector. From 1892 to 1914 he was director of the Neutestamentarisch-exegetischen Seminar at Leipzig.

Selected works 
 Die Valentinianische Gnosis und die heilige Schrift; eine Studie, 1871 – Valentinian gnosis and the Holy Scriptures.
 Das erste Sendschreiben das Apostel Paulus an die Korinthier, 1880 – The first epistle of Saint Paul to the Corinthians.
 Das zweite Sendschreiben des Apostel Paulus an die Korinthier, 1887 – The second epistle of Saint Paul to the Corinthians.
 Theologische encyklopädie, 1893 – Theological encyclopedia.
 Das Urchristentum, 1902 – Early Christianity.
 Die Bergpredigt (Matth. 5-7. Luk. 6, 20-49) Begriffsgeschichtlich untersucht, 1905 – The Sermon on the Mount, a conceptual history.
 Hellenismus und Christentum, 1909 – Hellenism and Christianity.
 Die Eigenart des Christentums, 1911 – The uniqueness of Christianity.
 Die Hermes-mystik und das Neue Testament, 1918 – Hermeticism and the New Testament.

References 

1844 births
1915 deaths
Academic staff of the University of Marburg
Academic staff of Leipzig University
Rectors of Leipzig University
19th-century German Protestant theologians
20th-century German Protestant theologians
People from Slavsky District
People from East Prussia